Udall is a city in Cowley County, Kansas, United States.  As of the 2020 census, the population of the city was 661.

History
The first post office at Udall was established in September 1879. J.M. Napier and P.W. Smith  purchased ten-acre tract from I.N Nelson in 1879. Udall was laid out in 1881 by Napier and Smith. It was named after English author Cornelius Udall. D.C. Green built the first house in Udall and opened a store.

1955 tornado

On May 25, 1955, the deadliest tornado to ever hit the state of Kansas struck Udall at 10:35 p.m. The water tower had been knocked over and the streets were flooded. Vehicles were thrown hundreds of yards and mangled beyond recognition, including a pickup truck that was wrapped around a tree and stripped of everything but its frame and tires. The tornado killed 77 and injured 270, and 192 buildings were destroyed, including 170 homes. Around 50% of families lost one or more members.

Before striking Udall, there were no warnings issued by the Weather Bureau. Unknown to them, the same tornado-producing thunderstorm had just laid waste to the city of Blackwell, Oklahoma, where 20 died and 250 were injured.

Geography

Demographics

2010 census
As of the census of 2010, there were 746 people, 289 households, and 203 families residing in the city. The racial makeup of the city was 94.8% White, 2.0% Native American, 0.1% Asian, 0.5% from other races, and 2.5% from two or more races. Hispanic or Latino of any race were 3.1% of the population.

There were 289 households, of which 38.8% had children under the age of 18 living with them, 51.2% were married couples living together, 13.8% had a female householder with no husband present, 5.2% had a male householder with no wife present, and 29.8% were non-families. 26.3% of all households were made up of individuals, and 11.5% had someone living alone who was 65 years of age or older. The average household size was 2.58 and the average family size was 3.07.

The median age in the city was 31.7 years. 30.4% of residents were under the age of 18; 9.2% were between the ages of 18 and 24; 25.3% were from 25 to 44; 22.5% were from 45 to 64; and 12.5% were 65 years of age or older. The gender makeup of the city was 46.4% male and 53.6% female.

2000 census
As of the census of 2000, there were 794 people, 302 households, and 221 families residing in the city. The racial makeup of the city was 96.73% White, 1.64% Native American, 0.25% Asian, 0.63% from other races, and 0.76% from two or more races. Hispanic or Latino of any race were 3.27% of the population.

There were 302 households, out of which 41.1% had children under the age of 18 living with them, 59.6% were married couples living together, 10.3% had a female householder with no husband present, and 26.8% were non-families. 24.2% of all households were made up of individuals, and 9.9% had someone living alone who was 65 years of age or older. The average household size was 2.63 and the average family size was 3.16.

In the city, the population was spread out, with 32.2% under the age of 18, 10.5% from 18 to 24, 27.7% from 25 to 44, 18.6% from 45 to 64, and 11.0% who were 65 years of age or older. The median age was 28 years. For every 100 females, there were 92.7 males. For every 100 females age 18 and over, there were 94.9 males.

The median income for a household in the city was $37,639, and the median income for a family was $42,981. Males had a median income of $34,750 versus $20,227 for females. The per capita income for the city was $16,202. About 4.8% of families and 5.8% of the population were below the poverty line, including 8.0% of those under age 18 and 8.0% of those age 65 or over.

Education
The community is served by Udall USD 463 public school district.

The Udall Eagles won the Kansas State High School class 1A volleyball championship in 1973.

See also
 1955 Great Plains tornado outbreak

References

Further reading

External links

 City of Udall
 Udall - Directory of Public Officials
 Udall city map, KDOT
1955 tornado
 Udall tornado 1955 - Kansas Historical Society
 Udall tornado: Kansas town remembers the day it disappeared - The Wichita Eagle

Cities in Kansas
Cities in Cowley County, Kansas